Van Ling is a producer and creator of DVD menus for many popular movies, including the Star Wars DVDs. Ling graduated summa cum laude from the University of Southern California film school.
Ling has had a highly successful career as a visual effects supervisor for many major motion pictures and television, including Titanic, Terminator 2: Judgment Day, The Walking Dead, The Abyss, Starship Troopers, Doctor Doolittle, Vanilla Sky and many others. Ling also had a brief cameo in James Cameron's 1997 blockbuster Titanic, as the Chinese man, who was in real-life, a Chinese passenger named Fang Lang whom Fifth Officer Harold Lowe rescued from the sea.

He directed Cliffs of Freedom, an indie drama film starring Christopher Plummer, Billy Zane, Lance Henriksen, Tania Raymonde, Jan Uddin, Raza Jaffrey, Patti LuPone, Costas Mandylor, and Kevin Corrigan.

References

External links 
 
 

Living people
USC School of Cinematic Arts alumni
Year of birth missing (living people)